Bennett is a locality in Alberta, Canada.

Bennett has the name of R. B. Bennett, a railroad official.

References 

Localities in Rocky View County